Stereolepis is a genus of marine ray-finned fish from the family Polyprionidae, the wreckfish, which is native to the Pacific Ocean.

Species
The following two species are classified in the genus Stereolepis:

Stereolepis doederleini  Lindberg & Krasyukova, 1969 (Striped jewfish)
Stereolepis gigas Ayres, 1859 (Giant sea bass)

References

External links
 
 

Polyprionidae